Naili Moran (4 February 1908 - 14 March 1968) was a Turkish basketball player. Moran is often considered a forerunner during the early decades of Turkish basketball. He was a member of the Turkey men's national basketball team. He competed with the team at the 1936 Summer Olympics.

References

External links
 

1908 births
1968 deaths
Turkish men's basketball players
Basketball players at the 1936 Summer Olympics
Olympic basketball players of Turkey
Basketball players from Istanbul